The 2019 Sochi FIA Formula 3 round was a motor racing event held on 28 and 29 September 2019 at the Sochi Autodrom, Sochi, Russia. It was the eighth and final race of the 2019 FIA Formula 3 Championship, and ran in support of the 2019 Russian Grand Prix. The title was clinched by Robert Shwartzman in the first race.

Classification

Qualifying 
The Qualifying session took place on 27 September 2019, with Robert Shwartzman scoring pole position.

Race 1

Race 2

See also 

 2019 Russian Grand Prix
 2019 Sochi Formula 2 round

References

External links 
Official website

|- style="text-align:center"
|width="35%"|Previous race:
|width="30%"|FIA Formula 3 Championship2019 season
|width="40%"|Next race:

Sochi
Formula 3